Patrick Cordier may refer to:
 Patrick Cordier (alpinist)
 Patrick Cordier (mineralogist)